Romano may refer to:

Food
 Pecorino Romano, a hard, salty Italian cheese
 Romano cheese, an American English and Canadian English term for a class of cheeses

Places

Italy

Municipalities in the Metropolitan City of Rome, Latium
 Arcinazzo Romano
 Barbarano Romano
 Castel San Pietro Romano
 Cineto Romano
 Magliano Romano
 Mazzano Romano
 Monte Romano
 Montorio Romano
 Olevano Romano
 Ponzano Romano
 Sant'Angelo Romano

Municipalities in the Metropolitan City of Rome, Lazio
 Bassano Romano
 Carpineto Romano
 Fiano Romano
 San Vito Romano
 Trevignano Romano
 Vivaro Romano

Other places in Italy
 Romano Canavese, a municipality in Turin, Piedmont
 Romano d'Ezzelino, a small city in Veneto
 Romano di Lombardia, a municipality in Bergamo, Lombardy
 San Romano in Garfagnana, a municipality in Lucca, Tuscany

Other places
 Cape Romano, a cape on the Gulf Coast of Florida, U.S.
 Cayo Romano, an island on the northern coast of Cuba

Structures
 Acquario Romano, a building in piazza Manfredo Fanti, Rome, Italy
 Estadio Romano, a multi-use stadium in Mérida, Spain
 Hotel Puente Romano, a hotel in Marbella, Andalusia, Spain
 Romano railway station, a railway station serving Romano di Lombardia, Lombardy, northern Italy, Milan–Venice railway
 Villa Romano, one of the greatest estates of "Valle della Cupa" and the biggest in Monteroni di Lecce, Italy

Other uses
 Romano (name), including a list of people with the name
 Chantiers aéronavals Étienne Romano, a French aircraft company that was merged into SNCASE
 Corky Romano, a 2001 American comedy film
 Diario Romano, a booklet published annually in Rome giving feasts and fasts to be observed
 Circolo Speleologico Romano, an Italian, non-profit organization that researches caves
 L'Osservatore Romano, the daily newspaper of Vatican City State
 Pontifical Gregorian University, called "Collegio Romano"
 Romano, as a prefix meaning "related to ancient Rome"
 Romano-British culture, Romanized Britons under the Roman Empire
 Romano's Macaroni Grill, a chain of Italian-style restaurants in the U.S., Mexico and Canada

See also 
 Romano-Germanic (disambiguation)
 Romanos (disambiguation)